Route 174 is a short highway in southwestern Missouri.  Its eastern terminus is at U.S. Route 60/Route 413 in Republic, its western terminus is at Route 39 in Mount Vernon.  It is a two-lane highway its entire length and was originally part of U.S. Route 166 between Republic and Mount Vernon. After the construction of Interstate 44 which replaced US 166 from Mount Vernon to Joplin, the highway was redesignated as Route 174.

Except for the endpoints, the only town on Route 174 is the unincorporated community of Chesapeake.

Major intersections

See also
Route 38, designated in 1922, part of which is now Route 174.

References

174
Transportation in Lawrence County, Missouri
Transportation in Greene County, Missouri